Chen Chih-yuan (born 1975) is a picture book writer and illustrator from Taiwan. Several of his books have been translated into English, including Guji Guji, the story of a 'crocoduck' described in a review by The New York Times as having "vivid characters...rendered with wit and warmth".

Chen is a three-time winner of the Hsin Yi Picture Book Award. The English-language translation of Guji Guji was an ALA Notable Children's Book and appeared on the New York Times Bestseller List.

Works
The Featherless Chicken Heryin Books, Inc., 2006, 

The Best Christmas Ever, Heryin Books, 2006, 
"小鱼散步" On My Way to Buy Eggs, Kane/Miller Book Publishers, 2003, 
Artie and Julie , Heryin Books, 2008,

References

Chinese children's writers
Living people
Taiwanese writers
1975 births